Girl is a 1994 Australian film directed by Peter Thompson and starring Karoine Hohlweg and Kristy Pappas. The screenplay concerns four teenagers who enter a magazine photo competition.

References

External links

Australian television films
1994 television films
1994 films
1990s English-language films
1990s Australian films